Triple Rush was an American reality television series. It premiered on April 14, 2011, on the Travel Channel. The program was about bicycle courier services in the city of New York.

Plot
Triple Rush gives you an insider's look at the chaotic workings of 3 different NYC courier companies as they battle for survival in this intensely competitive industry. We'll witness the bike messengers' hair-raising dashes through busy Manhattan streets—speeding between cars, racing through red lights and doing battle with taxicabs—all to earn a few dollars and support their lives in the fast lane. We'll also meet the dispatchers, who balance the needs of messengers who want non-stop, lucrative runs, customers who want excellent service and owners who want kick-ass couriers who don't make mistakes.

References

2011 American television series debuts
2011 American television series endings
2010s American reality television series
Travel Channel original programming